"Small Town Girl" is a song written by John Barlow Jarvis and Don Cook, and recorded by American country music artist Steve Wariner.  It was released in December 1986 as the first single from the album It's a Crazy World.  The song was Wariner's fifth number one country single.  The single went to number one for one week and spent a total of 24 weeks on the chart.

Charts

Weekly charts

Year-end charts

References

1987 singles
1986 songs
Steve Wariner songs
Songs written by Don Cook
Song recordings produced by Jimmy Bowen
Song recordings produced by Tony Brown (record producer)
MCA Records singles
Songs written by John Barlow Jarvis